Nirali Dineshchandra Thakker is an Indian born multi disciplinary artist living in Los Angeles, California. Nirali works in a wide range of media - painting, photography, writing and filmmaking.

Education 
She studied art at National Institute of Design in Ahmedabad, India and received a Bachelor of Fine Arts, Painting from M.S. University, Baroda, India. After moving to the United States Nirali studied at the Brooks Institute of Photography, Santa Barbara and received her Masters in Fine Art, University of Southern California, Los Angeles.

Scholarships 
Nirali received the Dean's Scholarship for Outstanding entering students from the Parsons School of Design, NY 1999. In India she received a National Scholarship in the field of Photography and Painting from the Department of Human Resources, Government of India as well as a 1997 Merit Scholarship at National Institute of Design and M.S. University Baroda.

Awards 
Amongst other awards, she received the Best Painting Award 2010 and the runner up prize for Best Painting Award 2009 - both from the Lakewood artist Guild, California. Nirali also received an AIFACS Award for Best Drawing, Gujarat.

Exhibitions 
The El Dorado Public library under "Art around town project" associated with Lake wood Artist guild Nov 2010.
Exhibited at "The Happening Gallery", Marina Del Rey, California 2010
“The Girl with pony Tales” solo show at the Exhibition Gallery, Faculty of Fine Art, Baroda, India (Nov 2-9, 2009)  
"The Girl with Pony Tales”- Hussain Doshi Gufa, Ahmedabad, India (Nov 11-22, 2009) 
Lalit Kala Academy gallery, Delhi India (Nov 24-2009)

Filmography 
Associate producer Picture hub films Mumbai India 2011-2012
Freelance sound engineer at Sony entertainment Television India 2011.
Production Design for PSA for Kids in Spotlight organization directed by Renee  McClellan
Currently producing a documentary on women's safety issues in India
Assistant Art director - “Get some” USC Thesis film showcased for Cannes film festival in shorts category. 2010           
“Women cinematographers” – Produced and Directed one of the first documentary on struggles of women cinematographers in a male dominated world of cinematography. Interviewed and networked with some of the top notch cinematographers in the country at American society of cinematographers ASC, Los Angeles USA. 2005-12
Producer for documentary- “Flash in the pan” A documentary about musicians of Los Angeles, 2008- 2010.
“Arranged Marriages in India” documentary(produced and directed)A documentary about western society's take on arranged marriage and Indian's views on arranged marriage as compared to the love marriage system.
Producer and director for short film “Insomnia” 16mm USC short.
Producer for short film "Phantasmagoria" 16 mm USC short.
Creative director for Sunflower films Inc, Orange county, Los Angeles 1999-2003
Assistant to William Fraker, Director of photography for “Rosemary’s baby” by Roman Polansky, Bullitt 2002

References 

1972 births
Living people
American women artists
American people of Indian descent
Maharaja Sayajirao University of Baroda alumni
University of Southern California alumni
21st-century American women